Feet of Clay is a 1924 American silent drama film directed and produced by Cecil B. DeMille, starring Vera Reynolds and Rod La Rocque, and with set design by Norman Bel Geddes. The film is based on the 1923 novel by Margaretta Tuttle, and Beulah Marie Dix's one-act 1915 play Across the Border.

Plot
Kerry Harlan (La Rocque) is unable to work because he was injured in a battle with a shark, so his youthful wife Amy (Reynolds) becomes a fashion model. While she is away from home, Bertha, the wife of his surgeon, is trying to force her attentions on Kerry and is accidentally killed in an attempt to evade her husband. After the scandal Amy is courted by Tony Channing, but she returns to her husband and finds him near death from gas fumes. Because they both attempted to make suicide, their spirits are rejected by "the other side" and, learning the truth from Bertha's spirit, they fight their way back to life.

Cast
 Vera Reynolds as Amy Loring
 Rod La Rocque as Kerry Harlan
 Julia Faye as Bertha Lansell
 Ricardo Cortez as Tony Channing
 Robert Edeson as Dr. Fergus Lansell
 Theodore Kosloff as Bendick
 Victor Varconi as Bookkeeper
 William Boyd as Young Society Man (uncredited)
 J.C. Fowler (uncredited)
 Lucien Littlefield (uncredited)

Preservation
With no copies of Feet of Clay located in any film archives, it is a lost film.

See also
List of lost films

References

External links

Stills at cecilbdemille.com

1924 films
1924 drama films
1924 lost films
Silent American drama films
American silent feature films
American black-and-white films
Famous Players-Lasky films
Films based on American novels
American films based on plays
Films directed by Cecil B. DeMille
Films shot in California
Lost American films
Paramount Pictures films
Films based on adaptations
Lost drama films
1920s American films
1920s English-language films
English-language drama films